Blues Creation is a Japanese rock band formed in Tokyo in 1969. Led by guitarist/singer Kazuo Takeda, they were known as Blues Creation from 1969 to 1972 and after a three-year hiatus returned as simply Creation in 1975.

Biography
Blues Creation was formed in 1969 by guitarists Kazuo Takeda and Koh Eiryu and singer Fumio Nunoya following the dissolution of their group sounds band The Bickies.

In October 1969 Blues Creation released their self-titled debut album of American blues covers, featuring songs written by Sonny Boy Williamson, Memphis Slim, Chester Burnett, J. Mayall-E. Clapton, Blind Willie Johnson, Willie Dixon and Otis Rush. After some lineup changes, August 1971 saw the release of their first album of original material, Demon & Eleven Children. That year they also released Carmen Maki & Blues Creation, which had the band fronted by female vocalist Carmen Maki. Each Blues Creation album other than their first features songs written by Takeda and consists of a constantly shifting lineup. At the end of that same year, Blues Creation released their final album, Blues Creation Live.

Takeda started a three-piece group called simply Creation toured Japan with American hard rock band Mountain in 1973. Mountain broke up soon after their Japanese tour, and partly due to hearing loss from playing so loud, bassist Felix Pappalardi focused on producing other bands. 1975 saw the self-titled Creation, which was produced by Yuya Uchida and featured a cover photo of a dozen nude boys full-frontal urinating.

Pappalardi decided to help Creation work on their next album and invited the band to his Nantucket, Massachusetts home for two months of rehearsals. Over that time the project transformed into a musical collaboration with songs being written mostly by Pappalardi, his wife Gail Collins Pappalardi and Takeda. The album recorded at New York’s Bearsville Studios was released in April 1976 as Creation with Felix Pappalardi. Creation released a final album Pure Electric Soul in 1977, once again featuring a cover with nude boys at the front of a bus. It was ranked number 62 on Rolling Stone Japans 2007 list of the greatest Japanese rock albums of all time, while its song "Spinning Toe-Hold" was named the 37th best guitar instrumental by Young Guitar Magazine in 2019.

Kazuo Takeda has released more than 20 solo albums including 1978's Super Rock in the Highest Voltage. He now works as a session guitarist in Los Angeles. Takeda attributes his further musical development to his friendship with Pappalardi who encouraged him to branch out into jazz and other styles. He occasionally still plays live in Asia with former Creation drummer Masayuki Higuchi, and most recently produced Hong Kong's premier bluesman Tommy Chung's album Play My Blues (2006).

Discography

Blues Creation
Blues Creation (1969)
Demon & Eleven Children (1971)
Carmen Maki & Blues Creation (1971)
Blues Creation Live (1971)

Creation
Creation (1975)
Creation with Felix Pappalardi (1976)
Pure Electric Soul (1977)
Pacific Rock Creation and Little River Band (1977)
Super Rock in the Highest Voltage (1978)
The Super Best (1978)
Lonely Heart (1981)
Rock City (1982)
Best of (1989)

References

External links
 Official website
 Stoner Rock magazine interview with Takeda Kazuo
 In Rock magazine (Russia) note about Blues Creation (in Russian language
 Discogs Blues Creation – Demon & Eleven Children

Japanese hard rock musical groups
Japanese psychedelic rock music groups